Joseph F. "Joe" Brennan (born January 12, 1964) is former a Democratic member of the Pennsylvania House of Representatives for the 133rd legislative district. He attended Moravian College, graduating in 1986.   

Prior to elective office, he served as chief of staff for former Pennsylvania State Representative T.J. Rooney. He also was a member of the Northampton City Council from 1998 through 2002.

He was elected in 2006.  

After allegations that he assaulted his wife and then drove drunk from the scene of the incident, Brennan announced that he was withdrawing from his bid for reelection.

References

External links
Pennsylvania House of Representatives - Joseph F. Brennan  official PA House website
Pennsylvania House Democratic Caucus - Joseph F. Brennan  official Party website

Living people
Members of the Pennsylvania House of Representatives
Pennsylvania city council members
1964 births
Pennsylvania politicians convicted of crimes